Hocine Bettir  (born 2 August 1990) is an Algerian Paralympic powerlifter. At the 2020 Summer Paralympics, he won the bronze medal in the men's 65 kg event. A few months later, he won the gold medal in his event at the 2021 World Para Powerlifting Championships held in Tbilisi, Georgia.

References

External links
 
 

1990 births
Living people
Algerian powerlifters
Paralympic powerlifters of Algeria
Paralympic bronze medalists for Algeria
Paralympic medalists in powerlifting
Powerlifters at the 2020 Summer Paralympics
Medalists at the 2020 Summer Paralympics
21st-century Algerian people